Richard Conrad (August 12, 1935 – August 26, 2019) was an American singer, voice teacher, and impresario whose voice at times inhabited both the tenor and baritone ranges. He sang in opera, cabaret and musicals. He is perhaps best known for his 1963 recorded collaboration with Joan Sutherland and Marilyn Horne, conducted by Richard Bonynge, known as The Age of Bel Canto.

Biography
Born in Astoria, Queens, Richard Conrad studied in Boston with Harry Euler Treiber, in Germany with Gisela Rohmert, and had other studies under Felix Wolfes, Aksel Schiøtz and Pierre Bernac. In his early years Conrad was a light baritone. He soon developed the ability to pass easily into the "head" register as well as the technical facility to manage the most intricate florid passages. Treiber and others began to recommend that he might emulate the "baritones" of the 18th and early 19th centuries, many of whom sang as tenors, and he began exploring the bel canto and unusual coloratura tenor repertoire. His operatic debut was in Boston in 1961, singing in the American premiere of Mozart's La finta semplice, and later that year he made his recital debut in Washington, DC. In 1963 he was brought to the attention of Joan Sutherland and Richard Bonynge, with whom he made a series of historic recordings of the florid bel canto repertoire.

In 1966 he settled in Rome, Italy and performed in opera, with orchestra, in recital, and on radio and television in many countries of Europe, England, the United States, Canada, and Africa. He returned to Boston in 1980 and founded the Boston Academy of Music (a reincarnation of a previously defunct organization of the same name). He managed the concert and opera repertory company for 23 years, presenting the American premiere of Sir Arthur Sullivan's grand opera Ivanhoe and many operas which had never been heard in Boston (Richard Strauss's Arabella, the original version of Verdi's La forza del destino, Rossini's La pietra del paragone, and many others). Subsequently he founded and led The Bostonian Opera and Concert Ensemble ("The Bostonians") with which he produced (and sang the role of Golaud) the New England premiere of the original version of Debussy's Pelléas et Mélisande, which was recorded by ARSIS AUDIO.

In 1983 he was the victim of a street mugging in which his voice was severely injured. After a long period of rehabilitation and retraining (under Gisela Rohmert at the Lichtenberger Institut in Germany), he reemerged (again as a baritone), specializing in the comic roles of Gilbert and Sullivan and the Italian bel canto composers.

In 1985 he began touring in revues of music by Cole Porter, Jacques Brel, Jerome Kern, Kurt Weill and Noël Coward. He made his theater debut in the premiere of Janet Hood and Bill Russell's Elegies for Angels, Punks and Raging Queens (New York 1990), and sang in the premiere of Move! at the Carre Theater in Amsterdam the following year. He has also enjoyed a success as Albin in La Cage aux Folles and as Cervantes/Don Quixote in Man of La Mancha.

Additional singing premieres include the American premiere of Haydn's Orfeo ed Euridice (1966), and the world premiere of Niccolò Castiglioni's I tre misteri (1968). As a producer, he sang and directed the American premiere of the two-act version of Donizetti's Maria Stuarda, and in 2003 he created the role of Montressor in Daniel Pinkham's The Cask of Amontillado.

For many years he was based in Boston, where his activities included teaching and mentoring, production, and stage direction, in addition to singing.

For his 70th birthday in 2005, he presented a recital of arias and songs at Massachusetts Institute of Technology. The composers included Noël Coward, Sir Arthur Sullivan, Ralph Vaughan Williams, Daniel Pinkham, Janet Hood and Henry Bishop. In 2011 he celebrated the 50th anniversary of his debut with over 40 colleagues at MIT's Kresge Auditorium.

Richard Conrad died on August 26, 2019.

Recording
Conrad's recordings include:
 The Age of Bel Canto, with Joan Sutherland and Marilyn Horne; Richard Bonynge conducting the London Symphony Orchestra and the New Symphony Orchestra of London
 Samuel Barber: Vanessa, complete recording
 Arthur Sullivan: "Guinevere and Other Ballads"
 Songs by Stephen Foster
 Ezra Sims: Chamber Cantata on Chinese Poems
 Noël Coward: "A Room With a View": Noël Coward songs, with William Merrill, piano.

References

External links
Conrad can be seen on YouTube:
 here with Joan Sutherland in the duet "Tornami a dire che m'ami" from Donizetti's Don Pasquale
 here with Sutherland in the duet "Prendi, l'anel ti dono" from Bellini's La sonnambula
 here in "Vado in traccia d'una zingara" from Rossini's Il turco in Italia
 here in the Major-General's Aria from Gilbert and Sullivan's The Pirates of Penzance
 here in "For Every Love" and here in "You Rascal, You", from Samuel Barber's Vanessa
 here in a Noël Coward medley
 here in songs from Janet Hood's Elegies for Angels, Punks and Raging Queens, with the composer at the piano
 here, in Sir Henry Bishop's "Home! Sweet Home!".

and heard:
 here in "Erbame dich" from Johann Sebastian Bach's Cantata No. 55
 here in "Care selve" from Handel's Atalanta
 here in "Ich baue ganz" from Mozart's Die Entführung aus dem Serail
 here in "Voi che fausti" from Mozart's Il re pastore
 here in "Ecco, ridente in cielo" from Rossini's The Barber of Seville
 here with Sutherland in the duet "Un ritratto?...Sventurato il cor che fida" from Bellini's La straniera
 here in "Ferme tes yeux" from Auber's La muette de Portici.

1935 births
2019 deaths
20th-century American male opera singers
American operatic tenors
American operatic baritones
Boston University alumni
Farmingdale State College alumni
People from Astoria, Queens
Singers from New York City
21st-century American male opera singers